John-Baptiste Nguyễn Phuc Bửu Đồng (1912 – January 30, 1968) was a Vietnamese Roman Catholic priest from the city of Huế who was murdered by the Việtcộng during the 1968 Tet Offensive.

Life
Born as a Prince of Nguyen dynasty, Bửu Đồng was a parish priest of a village east of Huế. He was a great-grandson of Emperor Minh Mang, while his father was the minister of Interior during the reign of Bao Dai. As the area was inhabited by many Việtcộng, he worked hard to stay on good terms with both them and the Army of Vietnam (ARVN) during the war. In 1967, he reportedly invited both Việtcộng and ARVN soldiers to sit together for Christmas dinner. He accepted sewing machines for his parishioners from American USAID programs.

Death
On the first day of the Tet Offensive, 30 January 1968, Việtcộng troops led Bửu Đồng to a nearby pagoda for questioning. He was later released after a passionate appeal by elders of his parish. Five days later, the Việtcộng returned and searched his rectory. Seizing his binoculars, camera, typewriter and picture of Hồ Chí Minh, the troops led the priest, aged 57, and two seminarians away. His corpse was found on 8 November 1969 at Luong Vien, about 30 kilometers northeast of Huế. The bodies of two other Catholic priests were in the same grave. This location contained a series of graves with a total of 20 bodies.

Letters
In his eyeglass case were found three letters. One was to his aged parents, another to his brothers, sisters, and cousins. The third letter was to his parishioners. The letter read:

See also
Massacre at Huế

Sources

1912 births
1968 deaths
1968 in Vietnam
1960s murders in Vietnam
1968 crimes in Vietnam
1968 murders in Asia
20th-century Roman Catholic martyrs
20th-century Vietnamese Roman Catholic priests
Martyred Roman Catholic priests
Place of birth missing
People murdered in Vietnam
Victims of anti-Catholic violence in Vietnam
Vietnamese people of the Vietnam War
Vietnamese murder victims
Vietnamese anti-communists
Vietnam War casualties
Vietnam War crimes by the Viet Cong